Sonic Origami is the 20th studio album by British rock band Uriah Heep and was released in September 1998.

The opening track, "Between Two Worlds", is dedicated to David Byron and Gary Thain, both members of Uriah Heep who died at a young age. It is the final Uriah Heep album to feature long-standing drummer Lee Kerslake, due to ill health forcing his departure from the band in 2007.

The limited edition version of the CD contains one additional track.

Track listing
All songs written by Mick Box and Phil Lanzon, except where noted.

Personnel
Uriah Heep
Mick Box – guitar, backing vocals
Lee Kerslake – drums, backing vocals
Trevor Bolder – bass, backing vocals
Phil Lanzon – keyboards, backing vocals, orchestral arrangements on "The Golden Palace"
Bernie Shaw – vocals

Production
Pip Williams – producer, arrangements with Uriah Heep
Norman Goodman – engineer
Stuart Campbell – additional engineering
Tony Bridge – mastering at Whitfield Street Recording Studios, London

References

Uriah Heep (band) albums
1998 albums
Eagle Records albums
Spitfire Records albums